Pittsburg is an unincorporated community in Tishomingo County, Mississippi, United States. It was named for the industrial heritage of Pittsburgh, Pennsylvania.

External links

Unincorporated communities in Mississippi
Unincorporated communities in Tishomingo County, Mississippi